Lincoln County is a county in the U.S. state of New Mexico. As of the 2010 census, the population was 20,497. Its county seat is Carrizozo, while its largest community is Ruidoso.

History

Lincoln County was named in honor of President Abraham Lincoln.  It was once the largest county in the United States. In the late 1870s the Lincoln County War began between ranchers and the owners of the county's largest general store. William Bonney, better known as Billy the Kid, became involved on the side of the ranchers after his friend and employer was killed. In the end, Bonney killed the county sheriff, a deputy, and the deputy that killed his friend. Several other people were slain in the conflict, which included the other leader of the rancher faction. His death ended the conflict. In 1878, the new territorial governor, retired Union General Lew Wallace, offered amnesty to the combatants to bring a long-lasting truce between the factions.

Most of the population is in the Greater Ruidoso Area. The town of Carrizozo serves as the county seat and is in the Tularosa Basin northwest of Ruidoso. Ruidoso boasts several small suburbs and neighbor communities including Ruidoso Downs, Hollywood, Mescalero, and Alto which contribute to the Ruidoso Micropolitan Statistical Area's population of 21,224. Ruidoso serves as the second largest city in south central New Mexico behind Alamogordo which is 46 miles southwest of the village. Ruidoso Downs on the southern end of the county and southeast of Ruidoso operates the Ruidoso Downs Racetrack and Casino. The track hosts both thoroughbred and quarter horse racing, notably the All American Futurity, the richest in quarter horse racing. Historical figures from Lincoln County include Billy the Kid and Smokey Bear, whose names help drive the tourism trade that is heavily popularized within the county.

Geography

Adjacent counties
 Torrance County – north
 Guadalupe County – north
 De Baca County – northeast
 Chaves County – east
 Otero County – south
 Sierra County – southwest
 Socorro County – west

National protected areas
 Cibola National Forest (part)
 Fort Stanton – Snowy River Cave National Conservation Area
 Lincoln National Forest (part)

Demographics

2000 census
As of the 2000 census, there were 19,411 people, 8,202 households, and 5,634 families living in the county. The population density was 4 people per square mile (2/km2). There were 15,298 housing units at an average density of 3 per square mile (1/km2). The racial makeup of the county was 83.60% White, 0.35% Black or African American, 1.95% Native American, 0.27% Asian, 0.06% Pacific Islander, 11.28% from other races, and 2.48% from two or more races.  25.63% of the population were Hispanic or Latino of any race.

There were 8,202 households, out of which 26.20% had children under the age of 18 living with them, 55.60% were married couples living together, 9.30% had a female householder with no husband present, and 31.30% were non-families. 26.70% of all households were made up of individuals, and 10.00% had someone living alone who was 65 years of age or older. The average household size was 2.34 and the average family size was 2.80.

In the county, the population was spread out, with 22.70% under the age of 18, 6.00% from 18 to 24, 23.20% from 25 to 44, 30.20% from 45 to 64, and 17.90% who were 65 years of age or older. The median age was 44 years. For every 100 females there were 95.90 males. For every 100 females age 18 and over, there were 93.30 males.

The median income for a household in the county was $33,886, and the median income for a family was $40,035. Males had a median income of $27,323 versus $19,923 for females. The per capita income for the county was $19,338.  About 10.80% of families and 14.90% of the population were below the poverty line, including 24.70% of those under age 18 and 8.70% of those age 65 or over.

2010 census
As of the 2010 census, there were 20,497 people, 9,219 households, and 5,859 families living in the county. The racial makeup of the county was 85.1% white, 2.4% American Indian, 0.5% black or African American, 0.4% Asian, 9.2% from other races, and 2.5% from two or more races. Those of Hispanic or Latino origin made up 29.8% of the population. In terms of ancestry, 17.0% were Irish, 15.6% were German, 12.3% were English, and 4.8% were American.

Of the 9,219 households, 23.3% had children under the age of 18 living with them, 49.5% were married couples living together, 9.8% had a female householder with no husband present, 36.4% were non-families, and 30.5% of all households were made up of individuals. The average household size was 2.21 and the average family size was 2.72. The median age was 49.4 years.

The median income for a household in the county was $43,750 and the median income for a family was $53,871. Males had a median income of $34,306 versus $29,836 for females. The per capita income for the county was $24,290. About 8.1% of families and 12.9% of the population were below the poverty line, including 20.7% of those under age 18 and 7.8% of those age 65 or over.

Communities

City
 Ruidoso Downs

Town
 Carrizozo (county seat)

Villages
 Capitan
 Corona
 Ruidoso

Census-designated place
 Nogal

Other communities

 Alto
 Arabela
 Bluewater
 Coyote
 Glencoe
 Hondo
 Oscuro
 Picacho
 Riverside
 San Patricio
 Tinnie

Ghost towns
 Jicarilla
 Placitas
 White Oaks

Politics
Lincoln County is overwhelmingly Republican, voting Democratic in just 3 elections since New Mexico's founding (1912, 1932, 1936). It was one of only three counties in the state to support Barry Goldwater of neighboring Arizona in 1964, which is also the last time a Democrat managed even 40 percent of the county's vote.

Education
School districts include:
 Capitan Municipal Schools
 Carrizozo Municipal Schools
 Corona Municipal Schools
 Hondo Valley Public Schools
 Ruidoso Municipal Schools

See also
 National Register of Historic Places listings in Lincoln County, New Mexico

References

 
1869 establishments in New Mexico Territory
Populated places established in 1869